Dallas County is a county located in the U.S. state of Missouri. As of the 2010 census, the population was 16,777. Its county seat is Buffalo. The county was organized in 1842 as Niangua County and then renamed in 1844 for George M. Dallas, who served as Vice President under James K. Polk.

Dallas County is part of the Springfield, MO Metropolitan Statistical Area.

Geography

Adjacent counties
Camden County (north)
Laclede County (east)
Webster County (south)
Greene County (southwest)
Polk County (west)
Hickory County (northwest)

Major highways
 U.S. Route 65
 Route 32
 Route 64
 Route 64A
 Route 73

Demographics

As of the census of 2000, there were 15,661 people, 6,030 households and 4,383 families residing in the county.  The population density was 29 people per square mile (11/km2).  There were 6,914 housing units at an average density of 13 per square mile (5/km2).  The racial makeup of the county was 97.45% White, 0.12% Black or African American, 0.76% Native American, 0.07% Asian, 0.03% Pacific Islander, 0.20% from other races, and 1.37% from two or more races. Approximately 0.94% of the population were Hispanic or Latino of any race. 3.57% percent reported speaking Pennsylvania German or German at home. Dallas County is the county with the largest concentration of Kauffman Amish Mennonites, who have preserved Pennsylvania German as their every day language and an old form of Standard German for church. They had 950 adherents in Dallas County in 2010.

There were 6,030 households, out of which 32.90% had children under the age of 18 living with them, 60.80% were married couples living together, 8.40% had a female householder with no husband present, and 27.30% were non-families. 23.70% of all households were made up of individuals, and 11.60% had someone living alone who was 65 years of age or older. The average household size was 2.57 and the average family size was 3.04.

In the county, the population was spread out, with 27.50% under the age of 18, 7.40% from 18 to 24, 26.40% from 25 to 44, 23.50% from 45 to 64, and 15.20% who were 65 years of age or older. The median age was 38 years. For every 100 females, there were 98.30 males.  For every 100 females age 18 and over, there were 95.70 males.

The median income for a household in the county was $27,346; the median income for a family was $33,500. Males had a median income of $26,438 versus $17,569 for females. The per capita income for the county was $15,106. About 14.20% of families and 17.90% of the population were below the poverty line, including 25.40% of those under age 18 and 18.50% of those age 65 or over.

2020 Census

Education

Public schools
Dallas County R-I School District – Buffalo
Mallory Elementary School (PK-04)
Buffalo Middle School (05-08)
Buffalo High School (09-12) 
Hickory County R-I School District – Urbana
Skyline Elementary School (K-04) 
Skyline Middle School (05-08)
Skyline High School (09-12)

Politics

Local
The Republican Party predominantly controls politics at the local level in Dallas County. Republicans hold all of the elected positions in the county.

State

All of Dallas County is a part of Missouri's 129th District in the Missouri House of Representatives and is represented by Sandy Crawford (R-Buffalo).

All of Dallas County is a part of Missouri's 28th District in the Missouri Senate. The seat is currently vacant. The previous incumbent, Mike Parson, was elected lieutenant governor in 2016.

Federal

All of Dallas County is included in Missouri's 4th Congressional District and is currently represented by Vicky Hartzler (R-Harrisonville) in the U.S. House of Representatives.

Political culture

Missouri presidential preference primary (2008)

Former U.S. Senator Hillary Clinton (D-New York) received more votes, a total of 1,157, than any candidate from either party in Dallas County during the 2008 presidential primary. She narrowly edged out former Governor Mike Huckabee (R-Arkansas) by four votes.

Communities

Cities
Buffalo (county seat)
Urbana

Village
Louisburg

Census-designated place
Bennett Springs

Other unincorporated places

 Boyd
 Celt
 Charity
 Cloverdale
 Elixer
 Foose
 Handley
 Leadmine
 Long Lane
 March
 Mathis
 Olive
 Plad
 Redtop
 Reynolds
 Shady Grove
 Spring Grove
 Tunas
 Wall Street
 Windyville
 Wood Hill

Notable people
Roy Meeker - professional baseball player

See also
National Register of Historic Places listings in Dallas County, Missouri

References

Further reading
 History of Laclede, Camden, Dallas, Webster, Wright, Texas, Pulaski, Phelps, and Dent counties, Missouri (1889) full text

External links
 Digitized 1930 Plat Book of Dallas County  from University of Missouri Division of Special Collections, Archives, and Rare Books

 
Populated places established in 1844
Missouri counties
Springfield metropolitan area, Missouri
1844 establishments in Missouri